There are numerous different names for Iceland, which have over the years appeared in poetry or literature.

In Icelandic 
Many names have been used to refer to Iceland in the Icelandic language. These names include colloquial, formal, and poetic forms:
 Eylenda , fem.—island, that is to say Iceland
 Stephan G. Stephansson
 Fjarst í eilífðar útsæ
 vakir eylendan þín. 
 Far in the eternal yonder sea
 your island wakes.
 Fjalladrottning , fem.—queen of the mountain or Iceland
 Fjallkonan , fem. with definite article—lady of the mountain, a figure representing Iceland
 Frón , neu.— old Norse word for land, Iceland
 Heima á Fróni. Garðarshólmi , masc.—Iceland, named after Gardar Svavarsson
 Hrímey , fem. Hrímgrund , fem. Hrímland , neu.—(the book Crymogaea occasionally uses “Hrímland”)
 Ísafold , neu. Ísaland , neu. ...og flykkjast heim að fögru landi Ísa. Ísland  - Iceland's official and most common name
 Jökulmær , fem.—Young woman of the glacier, Iceland
 Klakinn , masc—literally the iceberg or the ice cover Norðurey , fem.— literally meaning "northern island", used in jest in the Westman Islands since Iceland is north of them
 Skerið , neu-literally the skerry Snjóland , neu.—Snowland
 Snæland , neu.—the name that the Viking Naddoddr reputedly gave to Iceland in the 9th century meaning "snow land"
 Thule, neu.—some scholars claim Iceland was the land of Thule
 Týli , neu.—Thule
 Þyli , neu.—Thule

Icelanders also have several nicknames for themselves, including Frónbúi  or Frónverji  ("an inhabitant of Frón") and Landi  ("fellow countryman").

 In Latin 
Iceland has prominently been called by three names in Latin:
 Islandia—directly from Icelandic language "Ísland"
 Snelandia—a Latinization of the more poetic name Snæland Insula Gardari—literally meaning "Island of Garðar", compare Garðarshólmi In Norwegian 
 Sagaøya—"Saga Island"

 Other foreign languages 
Arabic: ; AyslandaChinese: ; ; Bīngdǎo, 
Danish, Norwegian, Swedish: 
Dutch: 
English: 
French: 
Finnish: 
German: 
Greenlandic: 
Irish: 
Portuguese: 
Russian: ; IslandiyaScottish Gaelic: , 
Spanish: 
Sanskrit: 
Turkish: 

References

External links
 "How did Iceland get its name?" – Iceland Review''

Iceland
Iceland
Icelandic culture